Sheykh Mostafa or Shaikh Mustafa may refer to:
 Sheykh Mostafa, Kermanshah
 Sheykh Mostafa, Razavi Khorasan